Talbiseh (also spelled Talbisa, Tell Bisa, Talbeesa) is a large town in northwestern Syria administratively part of the Homs Governorate, about 10 kilometers north of Homs. Nearby localities include al-Rastan to the north, al-Ghantoo to the southwest and al-Mashrafah to the east. The old town of Talbiseh is situated on an isolated hill. According to the Central Bureau of Statistics (CBS) Talbiseh had a population of 30,796 in 2004. Its inhabitants are mostly Sunni Muslims.

History
Talbiseh is built atop an ancient tell ("artificial mound"). In 1945 a large hoard of Byzantine Empire-era copper coins were discovered in Talbiseh. The roughly 835 coins, which dated back to 631 CE, consisted of three specimens depicting the emperors Justin II, Phocas and Heraclius Constantine.

Ottoman era
During the Ottoman era, particularly throughout the 18th-century, Talbiseh served as one of the principal rural fortress towns in northern Syria and it was located along what was known as the "Sultanic Road" which led to Istanbul, the seat of the empire. Its importance had grown as a result of the decline of Maarrat al-Nu'man and Hisyah. The Jundi family had normally provided the aghawat (governors) of the fortress, and would later provide three of Hama's governors around the year 1800. During a revolt by the Mawali tribes of northern Syria, the governor of Talbiseh's fortress, Abd al-Razzaq al-Jundi, was executed by the tribesmen.

Talbiseh was described as a village of mud houses in the mid-19th century. Unlike most Syrian villages at the time whose houses had flat roofs, the mud houses in Talbiseh had dome-shaped roofs. According to traveler Albert Socin, in the early 20th-century, Talbiseh's houses had a cubical base, conical roofs and no windows. The roofs were constructed of overlapping internal layers of stone.

Syrian civil war
Talbiseh witnessed large demonstrations protesting against the government of Bashar al-Assad in April 2011 as part of the 2011–present Syrian Civil War. Since the beginning of the insurrection, the city has become a stronghold for the opposition and the anti-government Free Syrian Army (FSA). As such, Talbiseh has been targeted by the Syrian Army and security forces throughout the uprising. Between 29 May and early June 2011 Syrian troops backed by tanks entered and besieged the city with the stated aim of rooting out "terrorist groups." Opposition activists claimed troops were raiding houses and arresting suspected dissidents. Five residents and four soldiers were reportedly killed in the first day of the operation.

On 8 June 2012, three civilians and nine Syrian troops were killed in fighting in the Talbiseh area. Heavy fighting between the Syrian Army and the FSA continued until at least 11 June. According to United Nations observers, the FSA took a number of government soldiers captive. The Syrian Army attempted to retake Talbiseh on 21 July, sparking heavy clashes in the city and subsequent artillery bombardment.

On 25 September 2012, France 24 reported that Talbiseh was under siege from all directions by the army. On 24 December 2012, the Talbiseh bakery massacre took place. More than 14 people were killed while queuing for bread at a local bakery, when they were bombed from warplanes of the Syrian government. On 24 March 2014, it was reported that the main obstacle preventing the rebels from breaking the siege of Homs city was the Malouk army complex, just south of Talbiseh. The Malouk complex is composed of many checkpoints, spanning 15 square km. It contains 60 tanks and tens of other military vehicles, in addition to 1200 soldiers. According to a pro-opposition source, on 24 February 2015, an infant was allegedly killed while government forces shelled over the city with mortars from the Engineering battalion in Al-Mesherfe village. In May 2018 the Syrian army entered Talbiseh with Russian support the thing led to displace hundreds of families to the opposition areas in northern Syria.

On 13 June 2022, four Syrian soldiers, including an officer, were killed in an attack by unidentified gunmen on a Syrian Army checkpoint near the town.

References

معام وأعلام من تلبيسة - عبد اللطيف السعيد وأحمد امين الضحيك21 -

Bibliography

Towns in Syria
Populated places in al-Rastan District